This bacterial growth medium was developed in 1971 for Lactococcus species isolated from milk products. It was originally called M16 medium, but in 1975 Terzaghi and Sandine added disodium-β-glycerophosphate to the medium  as a buffer, and named the new growth medium M17 medium. It was later found that the addition of disodium-β-glycerophosphate inhibits the growth of many Lactobacillus species.

Typical composition

Per 950 mL:

5.0 g Pancreatic digest of casein 
5.0 g Soy Peptone
5.0 g Beef extract
2.5 g Yeast extract
0.5 g Ascorbic acid
0.25 g Magnesium sulfate
19.0 g Disodium-β-glycerophosphate
11.0 g Agar

Preparation:

1. Heat with frequent agitation and boil for 1 minute to completely dissolve.
2. Autoclave at 121 °C for 15 minutes. Cool to 50 °C.
3. Add 50 ml filter sterilized 10% lactose solution and mix well (the lactose can be exchanged to other carbohydrates e.g. glucose, resulting in GM17 medium)

References 

Microbiological media